Burnham is a surname of English origin.

Notable people
 Andrew Burnham (priest) (born 1948), Church of England Bishop
 Andy Burnham (born 1970), English politician
 Bo Burnham (born 1990), American comedian, musician, and filmmaker
 Charles Burnham (musician) (born 1950), American musician
 Chris Burnham, American comic book artist
 Clara Louise Burnham (1854–1927), American novelist
 Clark Burnham (1802–1871), American politician
 Daniel Burnham (1846–1912), American architect and urban planner
 Daniel F. Burnham (1864–1957), American politician
 David Burnham (novelist) (1907–1974), American novelist
 Edwin Otway Burnham (1824–1873), American minister
 Eleanor Burnham, Welsh politician
 Enid, Lady Burnham, British-Argentinian Girl Guide scout
 Forbes Burnham (1923–1985), Guyanese politician and leader of Guyana
 Frederick K. Burnham, American motorboat racer
 Frederick Russell Burnham (1861–1947), American scout and adventurer
 George Burnham (1868–1939), American banker and politician
 Gracia Burnham (born 1959), American missionary
 Henry E. Burnham (1844–1917), American politician
 Howard Burnham (1870–1917), American spy for France during World War I
 Howard Mather Burnham (1842–1863), Union first lieutenant in the American Civil War
 Hugo Burnham (born 1956), English musician
 Iris Burnham, American educator
 James Burnham (1905–1987), American political theorist
 Jeremy Burnham, English actor and screenwriter
 Kevin Burnham (1956-2020), American sailor
 Lem Burnham (born 1947), American football player
 Linda Burnham (born 1948), American women's rights activist
 Paul Burnham, English businessman and cricket supporter
 Robert Burnham Jr. (1931–1993), American astronomer
 Russell Adam Burnham (born 1979), American soldier, "Soldier of the Year" in 2003
 Sherburne Wesley Burnham (1838–1921), American astronomer
 Thomas Burnham (1617–1688), English-born American lawyer and landowner
 Van Burnham (born 1971), American writer, designer, producer, and curator
 Walter Dean Burnham (1930–2022), American academic and expert on U.S. elections and voting patterns
 Watch Burnham (1860–1902), American baseball umpire and manager
 Zacheus Burnham (1777–1857), Canadian farmer, judge, and politician

In fiction
 Lester Burnham, the protagonist of the 1999 film American Beauty, played by Kevin Spacey
 Michael Burnham, a character in the 2017 television series Star Trek: Discovery, played by Sonequa Martin-Green

See also
 Burnham (disambiguation), a disambiguation page
 Baron Burnham, a title in the Peerage of the UK

English-language surnames